The discography of the post-hardcore band ...And You Will Know Us by the Trail of Dead consists of 11 studio albums, one live album, 22 singles, five EPs and 25 music videos.

Albums

Studio Albums

Live albums

Extended plays 

 Split EPs

Singles

Other appearances 

 "Let It Dive" from Worlds Apart was featured on EA Sports' MVP Baseball 2005

Music videos 
 "Mistakes & Regrets"
 "Relative Ways"
 "Another Morning Stoner"
 "All St. Day" (on the Worlds Apart' bonus DVD)
 "The Rest Will Follow"
 "Caterwaul"
 "Naked Sun" (Edit)
 "Isis Unveiled" (Radio Edit)
 "Summer of all Dead Souls"
 "Catatonic"
 "Lost Songs"
 "The Ghost Within"
 "The Lie Without a Liar"
 "Don't Look Down"
 "Into The Godless Void"
 "Something Like This"
 "All Who Wander"
 "Salt In Your Eyes"
 "Contra Mundum"
 "Penny Candle"
 "Millennium Actress"
 "Growing Divide"
 "Kill Everyone"

References 

Discographies of American artists
Alternative rock discographies